West Liberty Foods, L.L.C. is a farmer-owned food company headquartered in West Liberty, Iowa. Recognized as one of the top 50 protein processors in North America, the company has the capacity to produce over 650 million pounds of food products per year across four facilities. According to The National Provisioner, West Liberty Foods is the 34th largest meat and poultry processor in the United States.

West Liberty Foods meat and poultry products can be found in grocery stores and restaurant chains nationwide. West Liberty Foods has four locations: West Liberty, Iowa; Mount Pleasant, Iowa; Tremonton, Utah; and Bolingbrook, Illinois.

Information

The company primarily provides meat for other marketing brands, producing 90% of its product for customers while selling only 10% under the West Liberty Foods brand name. In addition to slaughtering turkeys, the company produces prepared beef, chicken, pork, and turkey products.  Company revenue has grown rapidly with US$65 million in sales during 1997, $120 million in 2000, and $200 million in 2003.  Most recently, West Liberty Foods posted $442 million in revenue for 2006, making the company the 56th-largest meat-packing company by sales in the United States.  Much of the company's sales come from large nationwide foodservice customers, and as of 2006, was Subway's largest supplier of sliced sandwich meat, providing the franchise with more than 1 million pounds per week. As a result of servicing national customers, the company is inspected more than other food manufacturers. West Liberty Foods' three plants have been ISO 14001 certified for meeting environmental management standards, and the West Liberty plant was the first turkey-processing plant in the United States to receive this certification.

West Liberty Foods maintains separate facilities for research and development and laboratory testing services.  They are housed in adjacent buildings several blocks from the plant in West Liberty.  The R&D facility includes testing space for both raw and cooked product, and can create test products from start to finish, including initial formulation, final slicing, and packaging.  The lab conducts product quality testing for the three production facilities and uses polymerase chain reaction (PCR) technology for rapid bacteriological testing.  This system can return results within 30 hours of production.

History
Prior to 1996, Louis Rich, the brand name for Oscar Mayer's turkey division, owned the processing plant in West Liberty.  In early 1996, Oscar Mayer's parent company, Kraft Foods, announced that they would close the plant that December if no buyer purchased it.  The Iowa turkey growers who sold to Kraft discussed purchasing the plant to ensure that demand for their birds remained.  In May 1996, 47 of the turkey growers formed the Iowa Turkey Growers Cooperative (ITGC).  ITGC purchased the plant from Kraft and took control of it in December.  The growers hired meat industry veteran Ken Rutledge to be president and COO of the company. Oscar Mayer helped West Liberty Foods by promising to purchase half of the plant's output in 1997 and a quarter of the output in 1998 to help the startup company.

Production under ITGC ownership began in January 1997.  The company faced financial difficulty because the turkey market was oversupplied and prices hit historic lows.  While financial projections assumed a price of US$1.92 per pound for turkey, prices averaged $1.46 per pound in 1997. During this time, four of the growers left ITGC.  Turkey prices eventually rebounded, and the company was bolstered by sales to Sara Lee near the end of 1998.

Since the rebound, West Liberty Foods’ sales have grown steadily.  In 2000, the company acquired a second plant in Sigourney, IA, from Pinnacle Foods to meet rising orders. The facility was sold in 2012.  The company grew again in April 2003 when it opened a processing plant in Mount Pleasant, IA, which was later expanded in 2004.  Company leadership changed in 2004 as Ed Garrett was named president and COO when Rutledge resigned to take a position with another growers' organization. In 2006, the company entered into a marketing alliance agreement with Midvale, Utah, based Norbest Foods.

On April 9, 2020 three workers were infected with COVID-19 at the company's plant in West Liberty, Iowa resulting in a shut down until April 14 due to sanitization being done.

Labor episode
In 2004, workers at the West Liberty plant considered joining the United Food and Commercial Workers International Union (UFCW).  On July 1, 2004, the workers voted on whether they would be represented by UFCW Local 431.  An initial tally of votes came out 301 in favor and 299 against union representation.  However, the count did not include 13 ballots which were disputed by UFCW.  The ballots were challenged on claims that they were cast by management personnel who would not be union members.

A National Labor Relations Board hearing to confirm or invalidate the vote was scheduled for January 5, 2005, but then postponed until February 16, 2005.  On February 1, 2005 the company and UFCW settled their dispute.  UFCW withdrew its objections, and West Liberty Foods posted a notice that they would not close the plant or fire workers if employees unionized.  This resulted in a final vote count of 303 to 308 against union representation.

UFCW Local 431 held a second vote at the West Liberty plant on July 15, 2005.  The vote was 231 to 322 against unionization.

In 2009, the company paid US$58,613.75 to Labor Information Services, an antiunion management services company connected to The Burke Group, to provide consultants who met directly with workers "either individually or in group meetings...regarding union issues."

Plants

West Liberty plant
The West Liberty plant is a  facility which slaughters and further processes turkey products.  The slaughter operation converts around 20,000 turkeys per workday.

Louis H. Rich purchased the West Liberty plant, a former tomato canning facility, in 1943, when he decided to expand the operations of the Rock Island Produce Company, located on 9th Street in Rock Island, Illinois.  The plant was converted to a poultry, including chickens and turkeys, slaughter facility in 1946 and refocused by Rich's sons, Norman and Martin, on turkey in 1949.  The plant was first expanded in 1960.  Oscar Mayer acquired the plant, through its purchase of Louis Rich, Inc., in 1979 and used it for turkey production until selling the plant in 1996.

Mount Pleasant plant
The Mount Pleasant plant is a  facility that is used for slicing cooked cheese, turkey, chicken, beef, pork, and other products.  The plant employs roughly 500 people working in three shifts.  A  Millard Refrigerated Services facility is located adjacent to the Mount Pleasant plant.  The two facilities are connected, and product is immediately transferred by conveyor from the plant to cold storage when packaging is complete.

The design and operation of the Mount Pleasant plant was developed to decrease potential hazards to food safety. WLF representatives have stated that the goal of the Mount Pleasant plant is to create a pathogen-free environment. Because company officials believe that the food safety aspects of the plant are unique in the meat industry, they submitted the plant design for patent approval through the U.S. Patent Office. This reduces the likelihood that pathogens will be carried either by air or foot traffic from a raw production area to Mount Pleasant's ready-to-eat production.

The Mount Pleasant facility consists of approximately 20 individual processing cells that are separated from one another and are set up so that they could operate as individual meat slicing facilities. Before antimicrobial flooring was poured, the cells were erected with stainless steel antimicrobial walls that are built into the floor. Each processing cell has independent refrigeration and drainage systems.

During operation, fully cooked meat or cheese logs arrive sealed in impermeable casings.  The logs go through a casing sanitation step that involves being treated with a sanitizing liquid before the casings are removed from the logs.  The logs then undergo a postlethality treatment by passing through an infrared pasteurization tunnel to kill pathogens on the logs.  The logs are then mechanically transferred to slicers, sliced, and placed in sealed packages that are transferred out of the processing cell.  The mechanical transfers decrease the risk of product contamination by reducing handling of product by personnel .

Food safety is a factor in hiring employees at the Mount Pleasant facility.  Before applying, potential employees must complete a 16-hour food-safety training course through Iowa State University.  The class includes written tests which each applicant must pass before completing the course.  On the job, employees must don a sealed clean room suit before entering slicing cells.  The suits are cleaned and sealed in a clean room laundry facility in North Carolina by the uniform company Cintas.  Employees replace the clean suit each time they leave the cell so each employee averages five suits per day.

Tremonton, Utah, plant
As of 2006, West Liberty Foods plans to build a plant in Tremonton, Utah. The company broke ground for the facility in October 2006. It is expected to begin production in July 2007. When completed, the plant will be the first in North America to slice  slicing logs. The plant will initially have ten slicing cells allowing production of 150 million pounds per year and will eventually add ten more cells to double the plant's capacity. At full capacity, the plant will employ more than 500 people. Similar to the Mount Pleasant plant, a  Millard Refrigerated Services facility will be built adjacent to the Tremonton plant for warehouse storage of refrigerated and frozen products.

Initially, the company investigated sites for the new plant in Utah, Nevada, and Arizona.  It requested US$5.2 million in tax incentives from Utah to build in Pleasant View, Utah.  On April 26, 2006 Utah's Department of Community and Economic Development approved a US$2 million tax-rebate over 10 years.  The incentives were conditioned on the new jobs paying a certain level above the county median wage, offering health insurance, and the company staying in Utah for 10 years.  Pleasant View offered another US$1.4-US$1.8 million in incentives.  However, construction in Pleasant View became impossible when it was discovered that much of the site consisted of wetland areas.  After this development, the state held the incentive offer open provided that West Liberty Foods could find another suitable site that met Utah's requirements.

On July 29, 2006, the company announced that they would build the new plant in Tremonton, Utah.  The tax incentives will total an 80% property tax break, but Tremonton is projected to experience a US$508 thousand financial benefit over 12 years after the plant is completed.  Of the 500 jobs at the plant, 300 are expected to pay between US$21,500 and US$26,875. The rest of the jobs will pay more with about 100 paying around US$37,000.

Bolingbrook, Illinois, plant 
West Liberty Foods opened its plant in Bolingbrook, Illinois, plant in 2014. By 2016, the Bolingbrook facility achieved ISO certification, as well as landfill-free status.

Awards
West Liberty Foods has received a number of awards from various organizations.

 2001 – Subway Supplier of the Year
 2003 – Paul Hill honored by the National Council of Farmer Cooperatives
 2005 – Economic Vision Award from USDA Rural Development, Best Business Recycling Program award from Iowa Recycling Association, Dedicated Services Award from Subway
 2006 – Ed Garrett named "Executive of the Year" by The National Provisioner, Mount Pleasant and Sigourney plants receive Safety Awards from Iowa-Illinois Safety Council, a chapter of the National Safety Council
 2007 – Quality Gold Standard Award from Subway
Hormel Spirit of Excellence Award in 1998, 1999, 2000, 2001, and 2002.
 2008 – Subway Supply Chain Partner Award – Iowa-Illinois Safety Council Safety Award -Food Quality Award
2021 - Top Green Providers by Food Logistics'

References

Agriculture companies of the United States
Manufacturing companies based in Iowa
Cooperatives in the United States
Brand name poultry meats
Food and drink companies established in 1996
Meat companies of the United States
Meat processing in the United States
1996 establishments in Iowa
Food and drink companies based in Iowa
Muscatine County, Iowa
Privately held companies based in Iowa
American companies established in 1996